Brachyrhamdia is a genus of three-barbeled catfishes native to South America.

Species 
There are currently six recognized species in this genus:
 Brachyrhamdia heteropleura (C. H. Eigenmann, 1912)
 Brachyrhamdia imitator G. S. Myers, 1927
 Brachyrhamdia marthae Sands & B. K. Black, 1985
 Brachyrhamdia meesi Sands & B. K. Black, 1985
 Brachyrhamdia rambarrani (H. R. Axelrod & W. E. Burgess, 1987)
 Brachyrhamdia thayeria Slobodian & Bockmann, 2013

References

Heptapteridae
Fish of South America
Catfish genera
Taxa named by George S. Myers
Freshwater fish genera